The 1922 Brunswick state election was held on 22 January 1922 to elect the 60 members of the Landtag of the Free State of Brunswick.

Results

References 

Brunswick
Elections in Lower Saxony